SBV Vitesse Arnhem (Stichting Betaald Voetbal Vitesse Arnhem), widely known as Vitesse or internationally as well Vitesse Arnhem, is a Dutch professional football club located in the municipality of Arnhem. Established on 14 May 1892, Vitesse is one of the oldest professional football clubs in the Eredivisie. Since 1998, the club has played its home games at the GelreDome.

Vitesse had its most successful period in the 1990s. Their best result in the Eredivisie was third place in 1997–98. They won the KNVB Cup in 2017 and also reached the final in 1912, 1927, 1990 and 2021. Throughout the years, Vitesse established itself as a stepping stone for future top class players like Raimond van der Gouw, Phillip Cocu, Roy Makaay, Sander Westerveld, Nikos Machlas, Mahamadou Diarra, Nemanja Matić, Wilfried Bony, Bertrand Traoré, Robin Gosens and Mason Mount.

History

Vitesse, founded in 1892, is the 2nd oldest professional football club still in existence in the Netherlands, after Sparta Rotterdam who were formed in 1888. The roots of Vitesse actually pre-dated Sparta by a year as in 1887, a club with the name "Arnhemsche cricket- en voetbalvereeniging Vitesse" was formed by a group of high school students who played their sport on the Rijnkade, overlooking the River Rhine in the city centre. Reluctant to choose a Latin or English name for the club as they felt those languages were too elitist, they picked the French word Vitesse, meaning "speed".

In 1891 the club disbanded as they were no longer able to find anywhere suitable to play cricket after a Velodrome was built on their usual playing field in the Klarenbeek Park. The following year a group of wealthy students resurrected the sports club, this time with the name AVC (Arnhemse Voetbal en Cricketclub) Vitesse. In the summer they played cricket and in the winter football. In the end of 1892, Vitesse played its first real football match, and in 1894 Vitesse disbanded the cricket branch. In 1895 and 1896 Vitesse became champions of the Gelderland competition. From the foundation of the Netherlands national football championship in 1898 until 1954, the title was decided by play-offs by a handful of clubs who had previously won their regional league. Vitesse lost the final of the national championship six times (1898, 1899, 1903, 1913, 1914 and 1915).

In 1912, Vitesse reached the final of the Dutch Cup Tournament for the first time. Vitesse lost the final with 0–2 from HFC Haarlem. In this period Vitesse had top players, likes Willem Hesselink and Just Göbel. These players were also active in the Netherlands national team. In 1914 John William Sutcliffe became the first foreign trainer.

During World War II, Vitesse did not play-official matches because playing football in the open air was forbidden. During the Battle of Arnhem, the residents of the city were forcibly evicted from their homes, allowing the Germans to turn the north bank of the Rhine into a heavily defended line. Residents were not allowed to return home without a permit and most did not return until after the war. The football field and clubhouse was completely destroyed. The damage was repaired in the years after the liberation.

In 1984 it was decided to divide the professional and amateur sections of the club. The professional section was renamed SBV (Stichting Betaald Voetbal – "Professional Football Foundation") Vitesse whilst the amateur section became "Vitesse 1892", which lasted until they disbanded in 2009.

From 1984, Karel Aalbers was the president of SBV Vitesse. Aalbers' goal was to bring Vitesse from the bottom of the Second League (Eerste divisie, now Jupiler League), the league in which the club originated, to the top 40 soccer clubs of Europe. He developed the basic idea for the 'Gelredome', a stadium with a sliding pitch that can be moved out of the building. Later, the same system was applied in Gelsenkirchen (Schalke 04) and in Japan. Events such as pop concerts can be held without damaging the grass. Gelredome opened in 1998. It has a roof that can be opened and closed. It is fully climate controlled as well. In the first season after the opening, Gelredome's attendance rose to 20,000, (from less than 8,000 in the old stadium).

Vitesse made their debut in European competition in 1990. The club won their first match in the first round 1–0 over Derry City.

The club remained financially sound through making notable profits on the transfer market. Players such as Roy Makaay, Sander Westerveld, Nikos Machlas, Glenn Helder and Philip Cocu were sold for large sums of money. Others came to occupy empty player positions, such as Mahamadou Diarra and Pierre van Hooijdonk. Vitesse finished in top 4 positions, made profits and showed a solid balance sheet in the final years of Aalbers' presidency. Also, the club became regular competitors in the UEFA Cup and in 1997–1998 finished third in the Eredivise, its record highest finish to date.

Herbert Neumann was Vitesse's manager over most of these years (1992–95 and 1998–99), while star players included: Nikos Machlas, the first ever Vitesse player to win the European Golden Boot in 1998 when he scored 34 goals in a season; John van den Brom, who played 378 matches for Vitesse during this period scoring 110 goals from midfield; and Edward Sturing, who played 383 matches in defence for Vitesse from 1987 to 1998, as well as receiving 3 caps for the Netherlands national team. Additional stars included Dejan Čurović, who spent six years at Vitesse playing 109 matches as a striker, scoring 41 goals including the first goal in GelreDome. Meanwhile, Dutch forward Roy Makaay spent four years at Vitesse, scoring 42 goals in 109 matches between 1993 and 1997.

Aalbers resigned on 15 February 2000, after the main sponsor, Nuon, threatened to pull the plug if he did not. Nuon, as a public utility company owned by local authorities, had trouble explaining why it invested heavily in Aalbers' ambitious plans. His successor was Jan Koning (former chief of Sara Lee/DE who resigned after four months). In a short period of time, Vitesse began to show negative financial results due to poor deals on the transfer market. The club survived numerous financial crises, such as the last one in 2008, when debts were bought off, under the threat of bankruptcy.

The club was in serious financial trouble, and in August 2010 its majority shareholder agreed to sell the club to the Georgian businessman Merab Jordania. There were rumors that this purchase was engineered by Chelsea owner Roman Abramovich. The club underwent a successful transformation into a modern, commercial sports organization and established itself as one of the dominant teams of the Eredivisie.

On 1 July 2012, Fred Rutten signed a contract as the new manager of Vitesse, for the season 2012-13. Rutten left Vitesse after the season, finishing in 4th place. Wilfried Bony ended the season as the Eredivisie's top scorer with 31 goals in 30 matches and was awarded the Golden Shoe for the best player in the Netherlands.

For the 2013–14 season, Vitesse appointed Peter Bosz as its new manager. In November 2013, Vitesse was top of the league in the Eredivisie for the first time since 2006. It was the first time since 2000 they'd been top of the league later than the first week. Halfway through the season, after 17 matches, Vitesse was the leader in the competition. Key players in the squad from this period included Davy Pröpper, Christian Atsu and Bertrand Traoré.

Vitesse announced on 13 June 2016 that Henk Fraser would replace Bosz at the start of the 2016–17 season. In his first full season, won the club first major trophy in its 125-year existence. Fraser defeating AZ by a score of 2−0 in the final of the KNVB Cup, with two goals from Ricky van Wolfswinkel. On 5 August 2017 Vitesse were beaten 1–1 (4–2 pen.) at De Kuip, Rotterdam in the Johan Cruyff Shield final by Feyenoord. In the 2017–18 UEFA Europa League group stage, Vitesse's opponents were Lazio Roma, OGC Nice and Zulte Waregem. Vitesse ultimately finished the group stage in fourth place. In October 2017, Guram Kashia wore a rainbow-striped captain's armband for Vitesse against Heracles Almelo in support of LGBT rights, leading to a backlash in his own country. In August 2018, he became the inaugural recipient of UEFA's #EqualGame award for his act.

In 2021, after beating VVV-Venlo in the semi-final, Vitesse reached the KNVB Cup Final for the fifth time in their history. Vitesse lost the final 2–1 to AFC Ajax. Vitesse finished the 2020–21 Eredivise season in 4th place. In July and August 2021, Vitesse qualified for the UEFA Europa Conference League. Vitesse knocked-out Dundalk F.C. (2-2 and 2-1) and R.S.C. Anderlecht (3-3 and 2-1) in the qualifiers. On 27 August, Vitesse was drawn on Group G of the 2021–22 UEFA Europa Conference League alongside Tottenham Hotspur, Stade Rennais and NŠ Mura. Vitesse eventually placed 2nd in the group, making it to the round of 32.

Stadium and training facilities

The club plays its home games at the GelreDome stadium, with a capacity of 21,000 seats. The GelreDome was built to serve as a multifunctional stadium suited for sports, concerts and other events. It was the first football stadium in the world to have a retractable pitch, and, after the Amsterdam ArenA, the second stadium in Europe to have a sliding roof. The pitch is surrounded on each side by four covered all-seater stands, officially known as the Edward Sturing Stand (North), Charly Bosveld Stand (East), Theo Bos Stand (South) and Just Göbel Stand (West).

The idea of building a multifunctional stadium, which had more than double the capacity of Vitesse's old Nieuw Monnikenhuize stadium, came from former Vitesse chairman Karel Aalbers. The ambitious chairman had been playing with the idea from as early as the late 1980s, but it took until 1996 and the prospect of the upcoming Euro 2000 championships for construction to finally begin. The GelreDome opened two years later, on 25 March 1998, with a league match between Vitesse and NAC Breda (4-1). Three international matches of the Netherlands national football team were played in the stadium, the first one being on May 27, 1998: a friendly against Cameroon (0–1). The last one, played on April 26, 2000, was also a friendly: a 0–0 against Scotland. In 2019, the Netherlands women's national team, also played their an international (friendly) match at the stadium. Furthermore, the GelreDome was the location for three UEFA Euro 2000 group stage matches, as well as the 2007 UEFA European Under-21 Championship tournament.

Vitesse's training facilities are conducted at National Sports Centre Papendal, located in the outskirts of Arnhem in woodland surroundings. The training ground consists of several pitches, a number of which have an artificial turf pitch, and extensive training facilities, including a fitness centre. Papendal, a mere twelve kilometers north of the GelreDome, is not only the training facility for Vitesse's first team; the youth teams play their home matches here as well. Its main field has seating capacity for 500 people. The complex is situated in large wooded area, where the players can prepare in a peaceful and private environment, whilst not being too far from the hustle and bustle of Arnhem's city centre. Papendal is also the base for administration staff, scouting department and all club coaches.

Stadium history

Symbols

Hertog
Vitesse are well known for the American bald Eagle 'Hertog', which is released before the match and flies over the crowds.

Anthems
Vitesse fans are known to be creative and have various songs and chants during matches. Among the most important Vitesse songs are "Geel en Zwart zijn onze kleuren" by Emile Hartkamp, "Ernems Trots" by Joey Hartkamp, and "Bouw mee aan een steengoed Vites!" by Henk Bleker & Enka Harmonie. Vitesse opens its home matches with "Whatever You Want" by Status Quo, and after every home goal "Bro Hymn" by Pennywise is played.

Mr Vitesse
Theo Bos was raised in Arnhem and started playing football from an early age. He began his career at amateur club Sv Sempre Avanti and played from 1979 to 1983 in the academy of Vitesse. Manager Leen Looijen gave him his professional debut on 13 August 1983 against FC Wageningen; the match ended in a 3–0 victory for Vitesse. Bos spent his entire playing career for Vitesse, making a total 369 appearances in 14 seasons with his club. After his playing career, Bos worked at Vitesse as youth coach, assistant coach and manager. He is therefore considered to be Mister Vitesse. In 2012, the south stand of the GelreDome stadium was named the Theo Bos Stand. Bos died on 28 February 2013 of pancreatic cancer, aged forty-seven. Following his death, a special remembrance to honour Theo Bos took place at Gelredome with around 7,000 Vitesse supporters. As of the 2012–13 season, no player will wear the number 4 shirt at Vitesse after the club decided to retire the shirt out of respect for Theo Bos, "the legendary number four". Dutch defender Jan-Arie van der Heijden was the last player to wear the number. In November 2013, his biography Het is zoals het is ('It is what it is') was published, written by journalist Marcel van Roosmalen. In 2015, a statue of Bos was erected outside of the training complex at Papendal.

Other club legends
Below is a list of players who have established themselves as club legends: 

 Edward Sturing
 John van den Brom 
 Martin Laamers
 Theo Janssen
 Ben Hofs
 Nicky Hofs 
 Frans de Munck
 Henk Bosveld
 Karel Aalbers 
 Willem Hesselink
 Just Göbel
 Bert Jacobs
 Frans Thijssen
 Raimond van der Gouw 
 Ricky van Wolfswinkel
 Marc van Hintum
 Herman Veenendaal
 Gerrit Horsten
 Boško Bursać
 Dejan Čurović 
 Nikos Machlas 
 Guram Kashia
 Willie Veenstra
 Jan Streuer
 Cor Guijt
 Jan Snellenburg
 Martin Esveld
 Jan Dommering 
 Dik Herberts 
 Toon Huiberts

Airborne-match

Around September there is an annual 'Airborne memorial' football match. During this annual Airborne-match the veterans of World War II will be honored. The Gelredome is decorated with Airborne flags, both outside and inside the stadium, and at halftime, 120 members of the Royal British Legion played the bagpipes with some other musical guests. Clubsymbol Hertog fly with the typical Airborne colours. The match is traditionally visited by veterans who were fighting in this battle, while a special shirt is worn by Vitesse. The club drop their normal striped black and yellow kit for this special match. Instead they wear claret and blue outfits, the same colours of the 1st Airborne Division, with a 1st Airborne 'winged horse' emblem also etched on the kit. Pictured on the collar sticker is the John Frost Bridge. These shirts are after the match auctioned for charity. In addition, Vitesse wearing a special captain's armband as a sign of recognition and respect for those who have fought for our freedom. In the 2014–15 and 2019–20 seasons, Vitesse played their away games in the same colours of the 1st Airborne Division.

Colours and badge
Originally, Vitesse played in white shirts with a blue sash from inception until 1900, paying hommage to the city's colours. At the turn of the century, player Reinhard Jan Christiaan baron van Pallandt offered to sponsor the club's shirts in exchange for Vitesse switching to his family colours of black and yellow. The board were quick to accept, noting that Vitesse, being one of the strongest team in the province of Gelderland, would be vindicated in playing in what could also be considered the province's colours (the flag of Gelderland is a tricolour in blue, yellow, and black).
 
The first logo of Vitesse was a shield-shaped crest. In the middle there was a diagonal dividing line between the left yellow face and the right black box. In the left box, "AVC Vitesse" was diagonally written and in the right-hand side, "1892 ", the club's founding year. The old logo was replaced in 1984, the year in which the roads of the BVO branch and the amateur branch separated. The amateur branch retained the logo with limited modification, SBV Vitesse got a new logo.

The new logo of the BVO from 1984 is once again a shield-shaped figure, but it has straight lines at both the top and sides of the logo. At the top is with thick white uppercase Vitesse. Under the name is a double-headed eagle counterchanged on a black and yellow field. This double-headed eagle can also be found in the coat of arms of Arnhem. In the middle of the logo is a football.

In the autumn of 2011, a new version of the logo was put into use; A total of 13 changes have been made. For example, the symmetry of the eagle was improved, the black outer edge replaced by a white and in the writing has been made thinner. The football has been altered in terms of appearance as a shadow effect is added and (if the context allows it) the year of creation as text EST. 1892 under the logo can be found.

Kit manufacturers and sponsors
Since 2019, Vitesse's kit has been manufactured by Nike. Previous manufacturers include Adidas (1982–89), Hummel (1989–90), Bukta
(1990–91), Diadora (1991–93), Umbro (1993–97), Lotto Sport Italia (1997–99), Uhlsport (1999–05), Quick (2005–06), Legea (2006–09), Klupp (2009–12), Nike (2012–14), and Macron (2014-19).
 
The club's shirts are currently sponsored by eToro. Previous commercial sponsors have been Akai (1982–83), Oad Reizen (1983–85), Spitman (1985–86), Schoenenreus (1987–89), RTL 4 (1990–1991), PTT Telecom (1991–92), BFI (1991–92), Spaarenergie (1992–93), Nuon Energy (1993–01), ATAG Benelux (2000–01), SITA (2002–03), Hubo (2002–03), Bavaria (2002–03), SBS 6 (2002–03), Sunweb Group (2003–04), AFAB (2004–2010), Zuka.nl (2010–2011), Simpel (2011–12), Youfone (2013–14), Truphone (2014–17), SWOOP (2017–18), Droomparken (2018–19), Royal Burgers' Zoo (2019–20), The Netherlands Open Air Museum (2019–20) and Waterontharder.com (2020–21).

Support

The supporters of the club are known as Vitessenaren. Vitesse has two independent fan bodies. The Supportersvereniging Vitesse was founded in 1992 and currently consists of 3,000 members. They own a fan base within the GelreDome. The second one, Arnhem Ultras, serve a more specific purpose: to improve the atmosphere in the stadium. Besides the fan unions, there are several sets of fans who work together on tifo choreography, likes VIVO (Vitesse Is van Ons), De Aftrap, VAK 113, VAK 212, RFFC, Crew 81 and BGN among others. Nowadays, Vitesse is supported by one fanatic side: The Theo Bos – South Stand. This stand is responsible for a big part of the atmosphere in the stadium.

Vitesse have attracted around 18,000 people to Eredivisie matches on average in the last years. The record attendance stands at 26,600, achieved in a match against NAC Breda at 25 March 1998. Research showed that about 10,000 season ticket holders from Gelderland, with other significant groups coming from Utrecht, South Holland and North Rhine-Westphalia.

The Vitesse Kids Club was founded by Vitesse in 1998 for children up to 16 years. Every year, the Vitesse Kids Club Day is organized, offering activities for members who are joined by the first team squad. During pre-season, Vitesse also holds an Open Day for people of all ages; the event gives the opportunity for sponsors and new player signings to be presented.

Vitesse fans have established a close friendship with the supporters of FC Petrolul Ploiești and RFC de Liège. Back in the days they had a friendship with Lierse SK till there was a big riot between them at a friendly match in 2011.

Rivalries

Rivalry with NEC 
NEC from Nijmegen are Vitesse's archrivals. The two clubs share a long history together and matches between the two clubs are called the Gelderse Derby (Derby of Gelderland). The rivalry between these two clubs goes beyond the football rivalry, it transcends into the city rivalry between the two largest cities of Gelderland: Nijmegen and Arnhem. This city rivalry began when these two cities first received their city rights. The two cities are just 20 kilometres apart, leading to an intense feeling of a cross-town rivalry, heightened by a feeling that local pride is at stake. The meeting between the two teams is still considered to be one of the biggest matches of the season.

The inhabitants of these cities differ extremely in both attitudes and cultures which is clearly reflected on the football pitch. Vitesse's style of play has long been a source of pride for the supporters, and one of irritation for the NEC fans.

Since 1813, Arnhem has been the capital of Gelderland, historically based on finance and trade. Arnhem is perceived as an office city with modern buildings. Nijmegen, on the other hand, is predominantly a workers' city, with middle and high-income groups in the minority. People from Nijmegen see Arnhem as arrogant and lazy.

Rivalries with other clubs
De Graafschap are also a rival of Vitesse, but in terms of tension and rivalry, these matches are not as loaded as the duels with NEC Nijmegen. The rivalry has existed for some time with De Graafschap and stems from various causes, such as the opposition between the large city (Arnhem) and the countryside (Doetinchem).

Further teams who share a rivalry with Vitesse include FC Twente, FC Utrecht and AFC Ajax. Past rivalries include local derbies between Vitesse and clubs such as FC Wageningen, Go Ahead Eagles, Quick 1888, Arnhemse Boys and VV Rheden. However, the tension between the local sides lessened as the division of the clubs through playing in different leagues over time became greater. Years of not competing in the same league resulted in less frequent match-ups, until tensions finally settled between the local clubs.

Players

Current squad

 

For recent transfers, see 2021–22 SBV Vitesse season.

Players out on loan

Retired numbers

Youth teams
The club is famous, however, for its Youth Academy, which is rated with the maximum of 4 Stars by the KNVB. Many players in professional football in Europe have played at Vitesse in the past including Roy Makaay, Robin Gosens, Ricky van Wolfswinkel, Davy Pröpper, Alexander Büttner, Stijn Schaars, Peter Bosz, Marco van Ginkel, Theo Janssen, Erwin Mulder, Eloy Room, Piet Velthuizen, Martin Laamers, Nicky Hofs and Mitchell van Bergen. All youth teams will train and play their matches at Papendal.

The Vitesse Academy comprises age-group teams ranging from U8's up to the flagship U19's. The youngest players are scouted at amateur clubs in the direct surroundings of Arnhem. For the age of twelve and older the academy extends its scouting area, mainly to the remaining part of the Netherlands and Germany. In Vitesse's youth efficient and qualified training is done by full-time coaches and organized by further employees looking after the administration. Goal of the sporting education is to train the youths from basic to development to performance levels, for them to fulfil the sportive and non sportive demands of professional football.

List of Vitesse coaches

No official coach (1887–1914)
 Edgar Chadwick (1914) 
 John William Sutcliffe (1914–1915) 
 James McPherson (1919–1920)
 Charles Griffith (1920–1922)
 Jan van Dort & Bram Evers (1922–1923) 
 Jan van Dort (1923–1924) 
 Bob Jefferson (1924–1927
 Heinrich Schwarz (1927–1936)
 Joop Damsté (1936)
 Gerrit van Wijhe (1936–1938)
 Gerrit Horsten (1938–1946)
 George Roper (1946–1947)
 Arie van der Wel (1948–1949)
 Gerrit Horsten (interim)  (1949)
 Jan Zonnenberg (1949–1954) 
 Joseph Gruber (1954–1957)
 Louis Pastoors (1957–1960)
 Branko Vidović (1960–1962)
 Jan Zonnenberg (1962–1964)
 Joseph Gruber (1964–1966)
 Frans de Munck (1966–1969)
 Cor Brom (1969–1972)
 Frans de Munck (1972–1974)
 Nedeljko Bulatović (1974–1975)
 Jan de Bouter (1975–1976)
 Clemens Westerhof (interim) (1976)
 Henk Wullems (1976–1982) 
 Leen Looijen (1982–1984)
 Henk Hofstee (interim)  (1984)
 Clemens Westerhof (1984–1985)
 Janusz Kowalik (1985–1986)
 Hans Dorjee (1986–1987)
 Niels Overweg (1987)
 Bert Jacobs (1987–1992)
 Herbert Neumann (1992–1995)
 Ronald Spelbos (1995)
 Frans Thijssen & Jan Jongbloed (interim) (1995–1996)
 Leo Beenhakker (1996–1997)
 Henk ten Cate (1997–1998) 
 Artur Jorge (1998)
 Herbert Neumann (1998–1999)
 Jan Jongbloed & Edward Sturing (interim) (1999–2000)
 Ronald Koeman (2000–2001)
 Edward Sturing (interim) (2001–2002)
 Mike Snoei (2002–2003)
 Edward Sturing (2003–2006)
 Aad de Mos (2006–2008)
 Hans Westerhof (2008)
 Theo Bos (2009–2010)
 Raimond van der Gouw & Hans van Arum (interim) (2010)
 Albert Ferrer (2010–2011)
 John van den Brom (2011–2012)
 Fred Rutten (2012–2013)
 Peter Bosz (2013–2016)
 Rob Maas (2016)
 Henk Fraser (2016–2018)
 Edward Sturing (interim) (2018)
 Leonid Slutsky (2018–2019)
 Joseph Oosting (interim) (2019)
 Edward Sturing (interim) (2020)
 Thomas Letsch (2020–2022)
 Phillip Cocu (2022–)

Board and staff

Corporate hierarchy

Management hierarchy

Owners 
After Karel Aalbers left, the financial situation for the club became dire. This downfall almost led Vitesse into bankruptcy in 2008, as they were not able to pay back loans given by their sponsor AFAB Geldservice B.V. Eventually the club arranged a deal that saw AFAB's owner, Maasbert Schouten, gain 100% of Vitesse's shares. Schouten immediately expressed his intent to sell the club, which opened the window for Merab Jordania to buy Vitesse. When Jordania, a former Dinamo Tbilisi player and owner, bought the team in 2010, Vitesse became the first Dutch club in history with a foreign owner. In 2013, Russian businessman Alexander Tsjigirinski bought the club from Jordania. In May 2018 a new acquisition took place at Vitesse. Valeriy Oyf became the new majority shareholder of Vitesse. The Russian oligarch, who was part of the Board of Directors of Vitesse from 2016, took over the shares of Tsjigirinski.

Chairmen
The first chairman was Frans Dezentjé. Willem Hesselink was chairman of the club from 1917 to 1922 and was appointed honorary chairman in 1962. Although Vitesse's coaches have come from all over Europe, the club's chairmen have been mostly Dutch, with Merab Jordania and Yevgeny Merkel as the only exceptions. The name of Karel Aalbers is inseparably linked to Vitesse. Although a club's success is never the work of a single man, nonetheless, the former chairman's part in the sportive and professional growth of Vitesse may be labelled as truly exceptional. Karel Aalbers handled the chairman's gavel from 1984 to 2000.

 Frans Dezentjé, 1982
 Dick Couvéé, 1892–1993
 Siegfried Leopold, 1893
 Fons Donkers, 1893–1895
 Chris Engelberts, 1895–1909
 Johan Caderius van Veen, 1902–1906
 Lodewijk Suringa, 1906–1908
 Jan F. Keppel Hesselink, 1908–1909
 Wim Hupkes, 1909–1916
 Daniel Brondgeest, 1916
 Willem Hesselink, 1916–22
 Lex Staal, 1922–1924
 Jan Holtus, 1924–1929
 Wim Hupkes, 1929–1936
 Henk Herberts, 1936–1947
 Jan Bosloper, 1947–1949
 Herbert Mogendorff, 1949–1951
 Henk Hoolboom, 1951–1955
 Henk Lammers, 1955–1963
 Henk Herberts, 1963
 Coen Winters, 1963–1965
 Herbert Mogendorff, 1965
 Herman Ribbink, 1965–1967
 Gerard Veerkamp, 1967–1969
 Arnold van der Louw, 1969–1974
 Eef van Amerongen, 1974–1979
 Piet Bodewes, 1979–1982
 Bob Treffers, 1982–1984
 Karel Aalbers, 1984–2000
 Jan Konings, 2000
 Jos Vaessen, 2000–2003
 Kees Bakker, 2003–2004
 Henk Ramautar, 2004–2008
 Kees Bakker, 2008–2009
 Maasbert Schouten, 2009–2010
 Merab Jordania, 2010–2013
 Bert Roetert, 2013–2016
 Kees Bakker, 2016–2017
 Yevgeny Merkel, 2017–2021
 Henk Parren, 2021–

Honours

Domestic
Dutch Championship/Eredivisie
 Runners-up: 1897–98, 1902–03, 1912–13, 1913–14, 1914–15
 Third place: 1997–98
 European competition: 2011–12, 2014–15, 2017–18
Eerste Divisie
 Winners: 1976–77, 1988–89
 Runners-up: 1959–60, 1973–74
 Promoted: 1970–71
Tweede Divisie
 Winners: 1965–66
KNVB Cup
 Winners: 2016–17
 Runners-up: 1911–12, 1926–27, 1989–90, 2020–21
Johan Cruyff Shield
 Runners-up: 2017

Regional
Eerste klasse Oost
 Winners: 1896–97, 1897–98, 1902–03, 1912–13, 1913–14, 1914–15, 1952–53
 Promoted: 1954–55
Tweede klasse Oost
 Winners: 1922–23, 1940–41, 1943–44, 1945–46, 1949–50
Gelderland Competition
 Winners: 1894–95, 1895–96

International
 UEFA Cup/UEFA Europa League (14 participations)
 1/8 final: 1990–91, 1992–93
 Group stage: 2017–18

 UEFA Europa Conference League (1 participation)
 Group stage: 2021–22

 UEFA Intertoto Cup (I) 
 Group stage: 1978–79

Club Awards
VVCS: Dutch Team of the Year
 Winners: 1989–90
Gelderland Sportsteam of the year
 Winners: 2017–18

Personnel honours

European Golden Boot
The following players have won the European Golden Boot whilst playing for Vitesse:
 Nikos Machlas (34 goals) – 1998

Dutch Footballer of the Year (Golden Boots)
The following players have won the Dutch Footballer of the Year whilst playing for Vitesse:
 Frans Thijssen – 1989 (Eerste Divisie)
 Edward Sturing – 1990 (Eredivisie)
 Wilfried Bony – 2013 (Eredivisie)

Johan Cruyff Trophy
The following players have won the Johan Cruyff Trophy whilst playing for Vitesse:
 Marco van Ginkel – 2013

Eredivisie Top Scorer
 Nikos Machlas (34 goals) – 1998
 Wilfried Bony (31 goals) – 2013

Eerste Divisie Top Scorer
 Herman Veenendaal (23 goals) – 1974
 Remco Boere (27 goals) – 1983

Rinus Michels Award (Manager of the year)
 Fred Rutten (Runner-up) – 2012/13
 Peter Bosz (Runner-up) – 2013/14, 2014/15
 Henk Fraser (Runner-up) – 2016/17
 Thomas Letsch (Runner-up) – 2020/21

UEFA's #EqualGame Award
 Guram Kashia – 2018

Vitesse in Europe

 Group = group game
 Q = qualifying round
 KPO = knockout round play-offs
 PO = play-off round
 1R = first round
 2R = second round
 3R = third round
 1/8 = 1/8 final

UEFA Current ranking

Dutch Cup finals

The winners of the cup compete against the winners of the Eredivisie for the Johan Cruyff Shield.

Johan Cruyff Shield

Club records

Highest transfer fee paid: Bob Peeters from Roda JC for €6.4 million, 2000
Record League win: 0–17 v Victoria, Gelderse Competitie NVB, 11 November 1894
Record Eredivisie win: 7–0 v Sparta Rotterdam, 14 April 2018
Record Eerste Divisie win: 7–0 v FC Wageningen, 30 August 1970
Record European win: 0–4 v Dundee United, UEFA Cup Second Round, 7 November 1990
Record home win: 14–0 v Victoria, Gelderse Competitie NVB, 20 January 1895
Record away win: 0–17 v Victoria, Gelderse Competitie NVB, 11 November 1894
Record home Eredivisie win: 7–0 v Sparta Rotterdam, 14 April 2018
Record away Eredivisie win: 1–7 v Fortuna Sittard, 27 September 1997
Record defeat: 12–1 v Ajax, Eredivisie, 19 May 1972
Record tournament defeat: 0–7 v PSV, KNVB Beker, Fourth Round, 4 May 1969
Highest ranking: 3rd in Eredivisie, 1997–98
Longest unbeaten run (League): 22, from 8 January 1967 until 17 September 1967 in Eerste Divisie
Most clean sheets in one season: 18, Eerste Divisie, 1988–89
Most League goals all-time by player : 155 – Jan Dommering
Most League goals in a season by player: 34 – Nikos Machlas, Eredivisie, 1997–98
Most goals scored in a match: 9 – Nico Westdijk v De Treffers, Tweede Klasse C Oost, 19 October 1941
Most League goals scored in a season: 85, Eredivisie, 1997–98
Most League goals conceded in a season: 74, Eredivisie, 1971–72
Most hat-tricks scored (League): 12 – Jan Dommering
Fewest League goals scored in a season: 22, Eredivisie, 1971–72
Fewest League goals conceded in a season: 20, Eerste Divisie, 1988–89
Fastest own goal: 19 seconds – Purrel Fränkel v Twente, Eredivisie, 3 October 2003
Most top scorer of Vitesse: John van den Brom, 5 times
Most international caps for the Netherlands national football team as a Vitesse player: Just Göbel, 22

Domestic results
Below is a table with Vitesse's domestic results since the introduction of the Eredivisie in 1956.

Statistics

Club topscorers by season

1954/55  Eltjo Veentjer (10)
1955/56  Eltjo Veentjer (10)
1956/57  Jan Schatorjé (16)
1957/58  Gerrit van der Pol (13)
1958/59  Loek Feijen (15)
1959/60  Loek Feijen (17)
1960/61  Loek Feijen (12)
1961/62  Jan Seelen (13)
1962/63  Jan Seelen (18)
1963/64  Jan Seelen (10)
1964/65  Jan Veenstra (12)
1965/66  Hans Verhagen (21)
1966/67  Jan Veenstra (22)
1967/68  Hans Verhagen (17)
1968/69  Henk Bosveld (15)
1969/70  Wim Kleinjan (11)
1970/71  Bart Stovers (10)
1971/72  Ben Gerritsen (5)
 1971/72  Herman Veenendaal (5)
1972/73  Bram van Kerkhof (20)
1973/74  Herman Veenendaal (23)
1974/75  Henk Bosveld (16)
1975/76  Henk Bosveld (10)
 1975/76  Boško Bursać (10)
1976/77  Boško Bursać (20)
1977/78  Boško Bursać (13)
1978/79  Henk Bosveld (7)
 1978/79  Herman Gerdsen (7)
1979/80  Hans Bleijenberg (11)
1980/81  Ron van Oosterom (14)
1981/82  Jurrie Koolhof (19)
1982/83  Chris van de Akker (10)
1983/84  Remco Boere (27)
1984/85  Henk Thijssen (8)
1985/86  Roger Schouwenaar (11)
 1985/86  Rick Talan (11)
1986/87  John van den Brom (17)
1987/88  Rick Talan (16)
1988/89  Jurrie Koolhof (13)
1989/90  John van den Brom (14)
1990/91  John van den Brom (8)
1991/92  John van den Brom (10)
1992/93  John van den Brom (15)
1993/94  Hans Gillhaus (22)
1994/95  Roy Makaay (11)
1995/96  Roy Makaay (11)
1996/97  Roy Makaay (19)
1997/98  Nikos Machlas (34)
1998/99  Nikos Machlas (18)
1999/00  Pierre van Hooijdonk (25)
2000/01  Matthew Amoah (11)
2001/02  Matthew Amoah (6)
2002/03  Matthew Amoah (15)
2003/04  Emile Mbamba (6)
2004/05  Matthew Amoah (13)
2005/06  Youssouf Hersi (10)
2006/07  Danko Lazović (19)
2007/08  Santi Kolk (12)
2008/09  Ricky van Wolfswinkel (8)
2009/10  Santi Kolk (7)
 2009/10  Lasse Nilsson (7)
2010/11  Marco van Ginkel (5)
 2010/11  Marcus Pedersen (5)
2011/12  Wilfried Bony (12)
2012/13  Wilfried Bony (31)
2013/14  Lucas Piazon (11)
2014/15  Bertrand Traoré (14)
2015/16  Valeri Qazaishvili (10)
2016/17  Ricky van Wolfswinkel (20)
2017/18  Bryan Linssen (15)
2018/19  Bryan Linssen (12)
2019/20  Bryan Linssen (14)
2020/21  Armando Broja (10)
2021/22  Loïs Openda (18)

Player of the Season
Vitesse's Player of the Season award is voted for by the club's supporters. It was first introduced in the 1989–90 season.

Most appearances

All competitions

Eredivisie

Europa

Top goalscorers

All competitions

Eredivisie

Europa

Vitesse All Stars

Other teams

Vitesse II
Vitesse's reserve team (Under-21) currently plays in the Beloften Eredivisie. It plays its home matches at Papendal and it is coached by Joseph Oosting. The team is composed mostly of professional footballers, who are often recent graduates from the highest youth level (Vitesse U19) serving their first professional contract as a reserve, or players who are otherwise unable to play in the first team.

Honours
The team's honours:
 Derde Divisie
 Champions: 2018
 Beloften Eredivisie
 Champions: 1993, 2015
 KNVB Reserve Cup
 Winners: 1998, 2002, 2011
 KNVB District (South)
 Champions: 	1992, 1993
 KNVB District Cup (East)
 Winners: 1990

Amateur team
In 1984 it was decided to divide the professional and amateur sections of the club. The professional section was renamed SBV (Stichting Betaald Voetbal – "Professional Football Foundation") Vitesse whilst the amateur section became "(AVC) Vitesse 1892", who played their home matches at the Sportcomplex Valkenhuizen. In total, the club has won 5 trophies; one Derde Klasse title, one Vierde Klasse title, one Zesde Klasse title and two Arnhem Cups. On 2009, Vitesse 1892 was declared bankrupt. The amateur section has produced a number of professional players including Andy van der Meijde, Nicky Hofs, Léon Hese, Erwin van de Looi en Theo Janssen.

Vitesse Legends

Vitesse Legends are a beneficiary team that was initiated by Ben Snelders, Leo de Kleermaeker and Dik Herberts in the 1990s, competing in at least one match a year, usually in the name of charity and/or to bid farewell to retiring former Vitesse players. The team is made up of various members of the Club van 100 of Vitesse who will come out of retirement for this match to face the current Vitesse squad. Past participants have included Theo Janssen, Marc van Hintum, Edward Sturing, Ruud Knol, Remco van der Schaaf, Nicky Hofs, Erwin van de Looi, Glenn Helder, Philip Cocu, John van den Brom, Theo Bos, Martin Laamers, Michael Dingsdag, Roberto Straal, Frans Thijssen, Dejan Čurović, Jhon van Beukering and Huub Loeffen.

National team players

A number of Vitesse players have represented the Netherlands national team, the first official international being Willem Hesselink. He was one of the founders of Vitesse in 1892 at age 14. In 1905 he started in the first ever home match of the Netherlands national football team, a 4–0 victory against Belgium. Some historians attribute one of the goals scored to him. Just Göbel played 22 matches for the Dutch team, being best remembered for his numerous saves during the 2–1 win over England's amateurs and his bronze medal in the football tournament of the 1912 Summer Olympics. The record number of Vitesse players for the Netherlands was three, which occurred on two occasions in 1989. The following players were called up to represent the Netherlands national team in international football and received caps during their tenure with Vitesse:

 Willem Hesselink
 Just Göbel
 Jan de Natris
 Gerrit Horsten
 Sjaak Alberts
 Wim Hendriks
 Hans Gillhaus
 Martin Laamers
 Bart Latuheru
 Edward Sturing
 John van den Brom
 Pierre van Hooijdonk
 Glenn Helder
 Roy Makaay
 Patrick van Aanholt
 Ferdi Vierklau
 Martijn Reuser
 Sander Westerveld
 Victor Sikora
 Theo Janssen
 Piet Velthuizen
 Marco van Ginkel
 Davy Pröpper

Notable former players

  Phillip Cocu (1990–1995)
  Pierre van Hooijdonk (1999–2000)
  Roy Makaay (1993–1997)
  Raimond van der Gouw (1988–1996)
  Glenn Helder (1993–1995)
  Orlando Trustfull (1997–2001)
  Frans Thijssen (1988–1991)
  Peter Bosz (1981–1984)
  Henk ten Cate (1975–1976)
  Sander Westerveld (1996–1999)
  Edwin Zoetebier (2000–2001)
  Ricky van Wolfswinkel (2008–2017)
  Marco van Ginkel (2010–2013)
  Davy Pröpper (2010–2015)
  Patrick van Aanholt (2012–2014)
  Stijn Schaars (2003–2005)
  Riechedly Bazoer (2019–2022)
  Paul Verhaegh (2006–2010)
  Eloy Room (2008-2017)
  Hans Gillhaus (1993–1994)
  Willem Hesselink (1894–1919)
  Henk Bosveld (1968–1979)
  Frans de Munck (1965–1967)
  Dick Schoenaker (1986–1988)
  Just Göbel (1909–1924)
  Alexander Büttner (2007–2019)
  Remko Pasveer (2017–2021)
  Gert Claessens (2001–2003)
  Bob Peeters (2000–2003)
  Onur Kaya (2005–2010)
  Loïs Openda (2020–2021)
  Paulo Rink (2004)
  Dieter Burdenski (1990)
  Simon Cziommer (2012–2013)
  Lewis Baker (2015–2017)
  Mason Mount (2017–2018)
  Didier Martel (2000–2003)
  Gaël Kakuta (2012–2013)
  Marco De Marchi (1997–2000)
  Luca Caldirola (2010–2011)
  Jordi López (2011)
  Eduardo Carvalho (2018–2019)
  Scott Booth (1998–1999)
  Nick Deacy (1979–1980)
  Nikos Machlas (1996–1999)
  Eli Dasa (2019–2022)
  Lasse Nilsson (2008–2011)
  Martin Ødegaard (2018–2019)
  Jacob Rasmussen (2020–2021)
  Milot Rashica (2015–2018)
  Tomáš Kalas (2011–2013)
  Tim Matavž (2017–2020)
  Guram Kashia (2010–2018)
  Valeri Qazaishvili (2011–2017)
  Slobodan Rajković (2010–2011)
  Nemanja Matić (2010–2011)
  Danko Lazović (2006–2007)
  Dejan Stefanović (1999–2003)
  Vladimir Stojković (2007)
  Ștefan Nanu (1999–2003)
  Matt Miazga (2016–2018)
  Claudemir de Souza (2008–2010)
  Lucas Piazon (2013–2014)
  Jonathan Reis (2012–2013)
  Lloyd Doesburg (1981–1986)
  Zakaria Labyad (2014–2015)
  Ismaïl Aissati (2010–2011)
  Oussama Tannane (2019–)
  Anthony Annan (2011–2012)
  Christian Atsu (2013–2014)
  Riga Mustapha (1998–2003)
  Wilfried Bony (2011–2013)
  Mahamadou Diarra (1999–2002)
  Ben Iroha (1992–1996)
  Tijani Babangida (2001–2002)
  Marvelous Nakamba (2014–2017)
  Bertrand Traoré (2014–2015)
  Thulani Serero (2017–2019)
  Giovanny Espinoza (2007–2008)
  Keisuke Honda (2019)
  Yu Hai (2007–2008)

See also
Dutch football league teams
Vitesse Dallas, an American indoor football club
National Sports Centre Papendal
GelreDome

Literature
Van Mierlo, Joost: Verspeelde Energie. Vitesse en Nuon, verslag van een explosieve relatie. SUN, Nijmegen 2001, .
Molenaar, Arjen: 111 Jaar Vitesse. De sportieve geschiedenis van Vitesse 1892-2003 Vitesse, Arnhem 2003, .
Van Roosmalen, Marcel: Je hebt het niet van mij. Een tragi-komisch verslag over de soap bij Vitesse. Hard gras, Amsterdam 2006, .
Van Roosmalen, Marcel: Het Jaar van de Adelaar. Hard gras, Amsterdam 2009, .
Van Roosmalen, Marcel: Geef me nog twee dagen. Hard gras, Amsterdam 2011, .
Bierhaus, Peter: Vites! 9 verhalen over onvoorwaardelijke liefde voor Vitesse. Ctrl-E, Arnhem 2011, .
Remco, Kok: Een Arnhemmer is niet voor Ajax. Lecturium, Zoetermeer 2014, .
Reurink, Ferry: Elke dag Vitesse. 125 jaar clubgeschiedenis in 366 verhalen. Kontrast, Oosterbeek 2017, .

Notes and references

External links

Official websites 
 Vitesse.nl Official website of Vitesse Arnhem 
 GelreDome.nl Official website of stadium GelreDome 
 UEFA.com The Vitesse Arnhem Story

General fan site 
Official supporters site

News sites 
 Vitesse Arnhem at SkySports.com
 Vitesse Arnhem at Goal
 Vitesse Arnhem at Football-Lineups.com

 
Football clubs in the Netherlands
Football clubs in Arnhem
Association football clubs established in 1892
1892 establishments in the Netherlands